Morehous Residential Historic District is a national historic district located at Elkhart, Elkhart County, Indiana. The district encompasses 110 contributing buildings in a predominantly residential section of Elkhart.  It was developed between about 1910 and 1950, and includes notable examples of Colonial Revival, Prairie School, and Bungalow / American Craftsman style architecture.  Notable buildings include the Roosevelt School (1921) and Simpson Memorial Methodist Church (1923).

It was added to the National Register of Historic Places in 2011.

References

Historic districts on the National Register of Historic Places in Indiana
Colonial Revival architecture in Indiana
Houses in Elkhart County, Indiana
National Register of Historic Places in Elkhart County, Indiana
Buildings and structures in Elkhart, Indiana
Historic districts in Elkhart County, Indiana